Ricardo Gerardo Higuera (born 1 May 1958) is a Mexican politician affiliated with the Party of the Democratic Revolution. As of 2014 he served as Senator of the LVIII and LIX Legislatures of the Mexican Congress representing Baja California Sur.

References

1958 births
Living people
Politicians from Baja California Sur
Members of the Senate of the Republic (Mexico)
Party of the Democratic Revolution politicians
21st-century Mexican politicians
Autonomous University of Baja California Sur alumni
People from Comondú Municipality
Academic staff of the Autonomous University of Baja California Sur